Goran Radonjić is a Montenegrin heavyweight kickboxer fighting out of Podgorica, Montenegro, captain of Montenegrin kickboxing team.
Radonjić is declared as the best professional Montenegrin kickboxer in 2011 by steering committee of Montenegrin kickboxing federation.

Biography and career
In Arhus, Denmark on March 8. 2008 Radonjić faced Edmoud M'Bullu-Monso, the fight was for vacant World Boxing Council Muaythai International Superheavyweight title. In first two rounds it appeared that Radnonjić would beat Monso with his punch-kick combinations, but Monso's leg kicks, powerful grappling and knees were enough that the fight ends up in his favor. Monso became WBC Muaythai International Champion after five round decision.

After Successful debut in Superkombat where he defeated Frank Muñoz in February 2012, he competed in the SuperKombat World Grand Prix IV 2012, on October 20, 2012, where he was announced to face Fikri Ameziane However, Ameziane pulled out due to injury and was replaced by Răzvan Ghiţă. Ghiţă defeated Radonjić via unanimous decision at the semi-finals.

Titles
Professional
 2008 WKA Heavyweight European Champion (Low-Kick Rules) +94 kg
 2007 Dželalija Grand Prix tournament champion (K1 rules)

Amateur
 2010 W.A.K.O. European Championships in Baku, Azerbaijan  +91 kg 
 2009 W.A.K.O. World Championships 2009 in Villach, Austria  +91 kg 
 2007 8. BIH Open 2007 in Bihać, Bosnia and Herzegovina  +91 kg 
2006 W.A.K.O. European Championships  +91 kg 
 2 times W.A.K.O. World Cup winner.

Kickboxing record (Incomplete)

Legend:

See also
List of WAKO Amateur World Championships
List of WAKO Amateur European Championships
List of male kickboxers

References

External links
Profile at FightLife.ru

1983 births
Living people
Montenegrin male kickboxers
SUPERKOMBAT kickboxers